Ronald James Bucknum (April 5, 1936 – April 23, 1992) was an American race car driver, born in Alhambra, California.

Bucknum participated in 11 Formula One World Championship Grands Prix, debuting on August 2, 1964. He scored a total of two championship points. At the 1964 German Grand Prix, he became the first person to drive a Honda-engined car in Formula One.

After Formula One, Bucknum drove in the USAC Championship Car series, racing in the 1967–1970 seasons with 23 starts, including the Indianapolis 500 in 1968–1970. He finished in the top ten 10 times, with his one victory coming at Michigan International Speedway in 1968.

He was the father of Jeff Bucknum, an Indy Racing League and American Le Mans Series driver. Ronnie Bucknum died in San Luis Obispo, California following complications from diabetes.

Complete Formula One World Championship results
(key)

Complete 24 Hours of Le Mans results

Complete USAC Championship Car results

Indianapolis 500 results

1936 births
1992 deaths
24 Hours of Le Mans drivers
American Formula One drivers
Indianapolis 500 drivers
Sportspeople from Alhambra, California
Racing drivers from California
Trans-Am Series drivers
Honda Formula One drivers
World Sportscar Championship drivers
24 Hours of Daytona drivers